"Tequila" is a 1958 Latin-inspired surf instrumental written by Chuck Rio and recorded by the Champs. "Tequila" became a No. 1 hit on both the pop and R&B charts at the time of its release and continues to be strongly referenced in pop culture to this day.

History
In 1957, Gene Autry's record label, Challenge Records, signed Dave Burgess (born 1934), a rockabilly singer-songwriter from California who often recorded under the name "Dave Dupree".  At the end of 1957, having produced no hits, Challenge Records looked to Burgess, who organized a recording session on December 23 in Hollywood.  In the studio that day were Burgess on rhythm guitar, Cliff Hils on bass, the Flores Trio (Danny Flores saxophone and piano, Gene Alden on drums, and lead guitarist Buddy Bruce), and Huelyn Duvall contributing backing vocals. They gathered primarily to record "Train to Nowhere", a song by Burgess, as well as "Night Beat" and "All Night Rock" (a song that has never been released).

The last tune recorded was "Tequila", essentially just a jam by the Flores Trio. It is based on a Cuban mambo song Como Mi Ritmo No Hay Dos by Cachao. The word "Tequila" is spoken three times throughout the tune. There were three takes, and Danny Flores, who wrote the song, was also the man who spoke the word "Tequila!" solo. The song served as the B-side for "Train to Nowhere", which was released by Challenge Records (No. 1016) on January 15, 1958.  Duvall recalls that the record initially found little success, but, after a DJ in Cleveland played the B-side, "Tequila" reached No. 1 on the Billboard chart on March 28, 1958.

Daniel Flores had written "Tequila", but, because he was signed to another label, the tune was credited to "Chuck Rio", a name he adopted for the stage. Those present for the December 23 session began recording together again on January 20, 1958, under the name the Champs; the group technically formed after recording "Tequila". The tune has been noted to have a similar rhythm structure to Bo Diddley's 1958 release "Dearest Darling".

The Champs recorded a sequel to "Tequila" entitled "Too Much Tequila". Released as a maroon-label Challenge single, it reached No. 30 on the Billboard Hot 100.  In 2020, group leader Dave Burgess resurrected The Champs and recorded 12 new tracks for an LP entitled Tequila Party. The album contains a "party" version of "Tequila".

Covers and references in popular culture

 Eddie Platt took the tune to No. 20 in the U.S. in 1958.
 Stan Kenton and His Orchestra covered "Tequila" for Capitol Records in 1958. Capitol Records No. 3928.
 Orquesta Tropicana recorded "Tequila" for their 1961 album, Noches De Caracas.
 The Piltdown Men released the tune as a single in 1962 called "Tequila Bossa Nova" (with "Tequila Bossa Nova" replacing "Tequila" as the calls).
 The tune was covered by the Ventures twice. Initially it was on their 1963 Dolton album The Ventures Play Telstar and the Lonely Bull, BST 8019
 The Yugoslav band Iskre released a cover in 1965. 
 The tune was covered by Bill Black's Combo: "Tequila"/"Raunchy", 7" single, Hi Records 45-2077, US 1966.
 Dizzy Gillespie recorded a version of the tune on his 1966 album The Melody Lingers On on Limelight Records.
 Jazz guitarist Wes Montgomery recorded a version of the tune on his 1966 album Tequila on Verve Records.
 Boots Randolph on his 1967 album Sax-Sational featured a version very faithful to the original.
 In 1968, Joe Loss And His Orchestra, a British dance band, recorded their danceable version on the album Latin A La Loss.
 The Button Down Brass released a version on their 1970 album, This is...The Button Down Brass.
 Hot Butter, known for their 1972 single "Popcorn", released "Tequila" as a single the same year.
 Dr. Feelgood covered the tune live on their 1974 debut album, Down by the Jetty.
 Bad Manners covered the tune on their 1980 album Loonee Tunes!
 Jazz guitarist Larry Carlton recorded a version of the tune, with scat vocals by Al Jarreau, on his 1983 album Friends.
 US band No Way José reached No. 47 in the UK chart with their version in 1985.
 The Reverend Horton Heat, on their 1990 album Smoke 'Em If You Got 'Em, recorded "Marijuana", which bears a strong resemblance in structure to "Tequila".
 A Latin hip hop cover in 1992 by A.L.T. & the Lost Civilization became a top-ten hit in Australia and New Zealand and reached number 48 in the United States.
 Industrial Metal band Klutæ released a reworking entitled "Tequila Slammer" on their 1995 EP Excepted, using samples of the original lyrics and horns layered with drum machines and heavy guitar.
 Keimzeit covered the tune on their 1996 live album Nachtvorstellung.
 Japanese band the Pugs do a punk-thrash cover of the tune on their 1997 compilation album Pugs Bite the Red Knee, using samples of the original recording. 
 Japanese reggae singer Corn Head covered the tune on his 2000 EP Young Generation.
 The Tony Levin Band released a version of the tune on their 2002 album Pieces of the Sun. This version has little resemblance to the original, aside from the occasional playing of the main tequila theme and a quiet utterance of the title three times during the course of the song. Levin claims a co-writing credit on his version.
 Spanish duo Azúcar Moreno on their 2002 album Únicas.
 David Sanborn covered the tune from his 2003 album Time Again. 
 Japanese hip-hop duo So'Fly covered the tune on their 2008 album Blood & Wine.
 Ska Cubano covered this tune on their 2010 album Mambo Ska, and it forms part of their current live set.
 Smooth jazz guitarist George Benson covered the song on his 2011 album Guitar Man.
 Pérez Prado covered the tune.
 A segment of the tune also appears in the song "What Happened?" by California punk/ska band Sublime on their 1992 album 40oz. To Freedom. The song is about the morning after a party and the word "Tequila" is replaced with "What Happened?"
 The saxophone riff was used by Suggs on his 1996 song "(No More) Alcohol".
 Ska punk band Reel Big Fish humorously played a portion of the tune as an intro to their song "Beer" on their 2011 tour with Streetlight Manifesto.
 Japanese ska band Oreskaband frequently cover the song in live performances.
 "Tequila" is the University of Washington Husky Marching Band "dynasty" song, with Husky fans sporting "Tequila!" bumper stickers and T-shirts. The band plays the song at every home and away football game.
 "Tequila" was featured in many post 1990s RatDog sets, usually segued into from "Sylvio".

Sheb Wooley's hit "The Purple People Eater" implies that "Tequila" is one of the songs the titular character learns to play with his horn; the last word of the song is the title character uttering the word "tequila." Both songs were released in 1958.
In the 1960 film Pepe, Cantinflas and Debbie Reynolds jumped out of a tequila bottle and danced to the tune "Tequila" dressed as Mexican peasants. 
"Tequila" was played in the 1961 film Breakfast at Tiffany's, during the party that Audrey Hepburn's character hosted.
The song is well known for being played during high school and college football games, usually performed by the school's band. 
The TV series Happy Days made a lot of use of the "Tequila" hit, especially at the diner scenes.  
In the 1980 film Cheech and Chong's Next Movie, the tune was played during a montage scene in which Cheech and Chong begin customizing Cheech's work van.
The 1985 film Pee-wee's Big Adventure featured a scene in which Pee-wee Herman knocks over a row of motorcycles, then proceeds to win over the angered bikers by selecting "Tequila" from the jukebox and comically dancing to it.  The "Pee-wee dance," as well as the character himself, have since been closely linked with the tune in popular culture.  This usage of the tune was further referenced in rapper Joeski Love's track "Pee-wee's Dance", which also used "Tequila"'s melody. "Earl of Bud" was a beer vendor who became famous for doing the dance routine at Buffalo sporting events. Professional wrestler Danhausen is also known to do the "Pee-wee dance" to the tune of Tequila in the middle of matches.
Canadian figure skater Kurt Browning used the song for his short program during the 1987–1988 season which included the 1988 Winter Olympics.
In the 1990 film Teenage Mutant Ninja Turtles, Michelangelo and Donatello dance to "Tequila" but change the lyric to "Ninjutsu!" 
"Tequila" is played during the dance competition at the start of Strictly Ballroom (1992). Other films in which it appears include JFK (1991). 
In the 1993 film The Sandlot, the song plays during a scene in which the main characters become nauseous and vomit while on an amusement park ride after chewing tobacco. This scene has been cut from some television airings of the film. 
In the 2006 film Night at the Museum, the tune is played at a party Cecil is attending. Larry calls Cecil for help, but is quickly hung up on when Cecil participates in the dancing of the song.
The song "Está llegando la banda" ("The band is arriving") uses the tune of "Tequila". "Está llegando la banda" is usually sung at Mexican Football Federation football matches. 
In the first season finale of the medical drama ER, "Everything Old Is New Again", the song is played at Carol's wedding whilst all the guests dance along and shout "Tequila" along with the song.
In the Friends episode, "The One with the Holiday Armadillo", Rachel and Joey claim that they have learned a song on the drum set that Phoebe bought; although what Rachel plays doesn't sound like an actual song, they both shout "Tequila!" after.
Charlie Sheen's character sings this in the Two and a Half Men episode "Principal Gallagher's Lesbian Lover", but changes the lyric to 'Gridlock'.
Mafia II featured the Champs' "Tequila" on the radio station Empire Central Radio during the '50s part of the game
 The Champs' "Tequila" is featured in Elton John and Tim Rice's "The Lion King" Broadway musical. The hit musical made its Broadway debut in 1997.
Terrorvision used the main elements of the melody of this tune as the basis of their song "Tequila", which reached No. 2 in the UK charts in January 1999.
 In the summer and early fall of 2009, the Ventures' version of the song was heard in The Weather Channel's Local on the 8s segments.
In Dave Gorman's Modern Life is Goodish at the end of S01E03 he replaces "tequila" with "free peeler!"
A recomposition of the song was used as the theme song for Banana Split from 2009 until 2011.
The 2017 movie Baby Driver features the Button Down Brass' 1970 version of "Tequila".
In 2017, Fans of Ipswich Town started using the song for their on loan midfielder Bersant Celina replacing "tequila" with "Celina!" 
Appeared in Who's the Boss? Season 3 Episode 24 – A Moving Episode.
The first few bars are sampled for one of the music tracks in EarthBound.
The 2019 video game Far Cry New Dawn features the Bill Black's Combo version of "Tequila".
On June 20, 2019, Andy Rowell performed his Karaoke version on America's Got Talent and received 4 yes's from the Judges and a Standing "Dancing" Ovation from the crowd
The song was featured in the 2021 Simpsons episode, The Last Barfighter.
The song has been adopted by supporters of English football club Tranmere Rovers and is sung at most home games.
The song was adopted by supporters of Arsenal in 2022 in honour of their defender William Saliba, replacing the word "Tequila" in the song with "Saliba".
The song has also been adopted by supporters of Brighton & Hove Albion, honouring winger Kaoru Mitoma, replacing “Tequila” with “Mitoma”.

See also
List of number-one singles of 1958 (U.S.)
List of number-one R&B singles of 1958 (U.S.)

References

1958 singles
1958 songs
Cashbox number-one singles
The Champs songs
Rock instrumentals